Heinz Richter (born 24 July 1947), is a German former track cyclist, who won the silver medal for East Germany in the 4000m pursuit at the 1972 Summer Olympics in Munich and 13 championships. He competed for the SC Dynamo Berlin / Sportvereinigung (SV) Dynamo.

References

External links
 
 

1947 births
Living people
People from Zittau
East German male cyclists
East German track cyclists
Olympic cyclists of East Germany
Olympic silver medalists for East Germany
Cyclists at the 1968 Summer Olympics
Cyclists at the 1972 Summer Olympics
Olympic medalists in cycling
Cyclists from Saxony
Medalists at the 1972 Summer Olympics
People from Bezirk Dresden